Eridania Planitia is a plain located east of Hellas Planitia, in the southern highlands of Mars. Its name was approved on September 22, 2010; it is named after the closest classical albedo feature.

References

See also 

 List of plains on Mars
 Eridania Lake

Plains on Mars
Eridania quadrangle